The small set expansion hypothesis or small set expansion conjecture in computational complexity theory is an unproven computational hardness assumption related to the unique games conjecture. Under the small set expansion hypothesis it is assumed to be computationally infeasible to distinguish between a certain class of expander graphs called "small set expanders" and other graphs that are very far from being small set expanders.

Statement
The edge expansion of a set  of vertices in a graph  is defined as 
This number can be as low as zero, when  is a connected component of the graph, because in this case there are no edges connecting  to other parts of the graph. For a regular graph with  edges incident to each vertex,

The edge expansion of a graph with  vertices is defined to be the minimum edge expansion among its subsets of at most  vertices. Instead, the small set expansion is defined as the same minimum, but only over smaller subsets, of at most  vertices. A small set expander is a graph whose small set expansion is large. The small set expansion hypothesis asserts that, for every , it is NP-hard to distinguish between  graphs with small set expansion at least  (good small set expanders), and  graphs with small set expansion at most  (very far from being a small set expander).

Consequences
The small set expansion hypothesis implies the NP-hardness of several other computational problems. Although this does not prove that these problems actually are NP-hard, it nevertheless suggests that it would be difficult to find an efficient solution for them, because this would also solve other problems whose solution has so far been elusive (including the small set expansion problem itself). In the other direction, this opens the door to disproving the small set expansion hypothesis, by providing other problems through which it could be attacked.

In particular, there exists a polynomial-time reduction from the recognition of small set expanders to the problem of determining the approximate value of unique games, showing that the small set expansion hypothesis implies the unique games conjecture. Boaz Barak has suggested more strongly that these two hypotheses are equivalent. In fact, the small set expansion hypothesis is equivalent to a restricted form of the unique games conjecture, asserting the hardness of unique games instances whose underlying graphs are small set expanders. On the other hand, it is possible to quickly solve unique games instances whose graph is "certifiably" a small set expander, in the sense that this can be verified by sum-of-squares optimization.

Another application of the small set expansion hypothesis concerns the computational problem of approximating the treewidth of graphs, a structural parameter closely related to expansion. The small set expansion hypothesis, if true, implies that there does not exist an approximation algorithm for this problem with constant approximation ratio. It also can be used to imply the inapproximability of finding a complete bipartite graph with the maximum number of edges (possibly restricted to having equal numbers of vertices on each side of its bipartition) in a larger graph.

The small set expansion hypothesis implies the optimality of known approximation ratios for certain variants of the edge cover problem, in which one must choose as few vertices as possible to cover a given number of edges in a graph.

History and partial results
The small set expansion hypothesis was formulated, and connected to the unique games conjecture, by Prasad Raghavendra and David Steurer in 2010.

One approach to resolving the small set expansion hypothesis is to seek approximation algorithms for the edge expansion of small vertex sets that would be good enough to distinguish the two classes of graphs in the hypothesis. This is not strong enough to refute the hypothesis; doing so would require finding an algorithm with a bounded approximation ratio.

Notes

References

Computational hardness assumptions